Charles Moser may refer to:

Chuck Moser (1918–1995), American football coach
Charles Arthur Moser (born 1935), American literary critic and political activist
 Charles Allen Moser, American physician and sexologist